Bert German (April 19, 1873 – September 13, 1956) was an American college football player and coach. He was the third head football coach for the Iowa State University in Ames, Iowa, serving for five seasons, from 1894 to 1898, and compiling a record of 22–10.

German later worked as a real estate agent in Des Moines, Iowa. He died in 1956 at a Des Moines nursing home after suffering a stroke a year earlier.

Head coaching record

References

1873 births
1956 deaths
19th-century players of American football
American football halfbacks
Iowa State Cyclones football coaches
Iowa State Cyclones football players
People from Maquoketa, Iowa